"Power Of Love" is a 1972 song written by Joe Simon along with Kenny Gamble and Leon Huff, and recorded by Joe Simon. The single was his second to hit #1 on the R&B charts, where it was at the top spot for two weeks.  "Power Of Love" also made it into the Top 20 on the Pop charts, where it was one of Simon's most successful crossover singles.  Billboard ranked it as the No. 83 song for 1972.

Chart positions

References

1972 songs
1972 singles
Joe Simon (musician) songs
Songs written by Leon Huff
Songs written by Kenny Gamble
Songs written by Joe Simon (musician)